The  is a mini MPV produced by the Japanese automaker Toyota from 2004 to 2020 that features an electric-powered sliding door on the passenger side, similar in approach to the Isis. The driver's door is of the conventional swing-open type.



First generation (AP10; 2004) 

The Porte was introduced in July 2004, but is only available in Japan, so it is only produced with right-hand drive. The Porte is based on the first generation Vitz subcompact car and is made in 4-seater and 5-seater versions.

It comes with either a 1.3-liter or 1.5-liter gasoline engine, with automatic transmission only, and with either front-wheel drive or four-wheel drive. It is similar in concept to the 2002 Peugeot Sesame and the slightly smaller Peugeot 1007 which has an electric-powered sliding door on both sides. However the door only slides on the left.

Second generation (XP140; 2012) 

In July 2012, the Porte was redesigned and for this generation, it introduced the  twin model, which sported a different front and rear design, as well as a slightly different interior color. The second generation Porte is sold at Toyota Store and Toyopet Store dealerships while the Spade is sold at Corolla Store and Netz dealerships across Japan, as well as Hong Kong and Macau, starting in August 2015. 

The two different engine  sizes gave Japanese drivers a choice as to which annual road tax obligation they were willing to pay; vehicles with the larger engine were equipped at a higher level than the lower trim level in compensation. 

In July 2015, the 1.3-liter engine option was dropped and a newer 1.5-liter 2NR-FKE engine was used for front-wheel drive models. This version has a fuel efficiency of  under the JC08 test cycle.

Toyota stopped the production of the Porte and Spade in December 2020.

References

External links 

  (Porte)
  (Spade)

Porte
Cars introduced in 2004
2010s cars
2020s cars
Mini MPVs
Hatchbacks
Front-wheel-drive vehicles
All-wheel-drive vehicles
Vehicles with CVT transmission